Dollar of Fire/Epitaph for a Fast Gun is a 1966 Italian-Spanish western film directed by Nick Nostro and starring Miguel de la Riva, Dada Gallotti and Alberto Farnese.

Cast
 Miguel de la Riva as Sheriff Sid/Kelly Brady
 Dada Gallotti as Nora Kenton
 Alberto Farnese as Senator Dana Harper
 Diana Sorel as Nora Kendall
 Gaspar 'Indio' González as Blacky 'Spider' Kendall/Sam Dollar
 Javier Conde
 Gustavo Re as a postmaster
 Mario Via 
 Fernando Rubio as a banker
 Juan Manuel Simón 
 Angelica Ott as Liz Kelly
 Carlos Otero as Judge Lang
 Joaquín Blanco as Sandy
 César Ojinaga as Ericson
 Eduardo Lizarza 
 Teresa Giro 
 Moisés Augusto Rocha as Henchman  
 Jesús Redondo 
 Alfonso Castro 
 Gabriel Giménez
 Miguel Muniesa 
 María Zaldívar
 Roberto Font
 Mario Maranzana

References

Bibliography 
 Thomas Weisser. Spaghetti Westerns--the Good, the Bad and the Violent: A Comprehensive, Illustrated Filmography of 558 Eurowesterns and Their Personnel, 1961-1977. McFarland, 2005.

External links 
 

1966 films
1966 Western (genre) films
Spaghetti Western films
Spanish Western (genre) films
Italian Western (genre) films
1960s Italian-language films
1960s Spanish-language films
Films directed by Nick Nostro
Films with screenplays by Ignacio F. Iquino
1960s Italian films